Ray Krone (born January 19, 1957) is an American who was wrongfully convicted of murder. He was the 100th inmate exonerated from death row since the death penalty was reinstated in 1976.

Krone was born and raised in Dover Township, York County, Pennsylvania and graduated from Dover Area High School in 1974.

He was labeled the "Snaggletooth Killer" (a feature which has since been corrected) and spent 10 years in prison, including two years on death row, after being found guilty of killing a bartender in Phoenix, Arizona in 1991. 35-year-old Kim Ancona was found dead in a bar where Krone often played darts. The 1992 conviction, which was upheld on appeal in 1996, hinged on expert testimony, included claiming an impression of Krone's teeth matched bite marks found on the victim's body, a detail that was disputed by dental experts called by the defense in court.

On April 8, 2002, Krone was released from prison after DNA evidence proved that he did not murder the victim and identified the killer: Kenneth Phillips, a repeatedly violent sexual offender. Journalist Robert Nelson later wrote that ample crime scene evidence and interviews should have excluded Krone as a suspect, and all pointed toward Phillips, but this data were ignored by the police and the prosecution's purported experts.
In 2005, Krone received a settlement of $1.4 million from Maricopa County and $3 million from the city of Phoenix.

Since Krone's release, he has become an activist working for the abolition of the death penalty, and he is the director of Membership and Training for Witness to Innocence. In February 2005, he was featured in episodes 13 and 14 of the third season of the reality television show Extreme Makeover. His story is detailed in Jingle Jangle: The Perfect Crime Turned Inside Out, written by Jim Rix, his cousin, who was instrumental in getting him freed from prison.

See also

 List of exonerated death row inmates
 List of wrongful convictions in the United States

Notes

References
 Canadian Coalition Against the Death Penalty
  Justice Denied – Issue 32
 The Innocence Project
 "Jingle Jangle: The Perfect Crime Turned Inside Out".

1957 births
Living people
Overturned convictions in the United States
American people wrongfully convicted of murder